Phymorhynchus speciosus is a species of sea snail, a marine gastropod mollusk in the family Raphitomidae.

Description
The length of the shell attains 37 mm.

Distribution
This marine species occurs in the Gulf of Panama at a depth of 3,200 m.

References

 Olsson, Axel A. "Biological results of the University of Miami deep-sea expeditions. 77. Mollusks from the Gulf of Panama collected by R/V John Elliott Pillsbury, 1967." Bulletin of Marine Science 21.1 (1971): 35–92.

External links
 
 Gastropods.com: Phymorhynchus speciosus

speciosus
Gastropods described in 1971